International Stadium may refer to:

 Amman International Stadium
 International Stadium Yokohama, former name of Nissan Stadium
 Jakarta International Stadium